Adriana Bazon-Chelariu ( Bazon, born 5 July 1963) is a retired Romanian rower. She competed at the 1984, 1988 and 1992 Olympics and five world championships between 1985 and 1991 and won 10 medals, including three world championship gold medals and three Olympic silver medals. At the 1987 World Rowing Championships, she still competed under her maiden name and at the 1988 Olympics, she started under her married name.

References

External links 
 
 
 
 

1963 births
Living people
Romanian female rowers
Rowers at the 1984 Summer Olympics
Rowers at the 1988 Summer Olympics
Rowers at the 1992 Summer Olympics
Olympic rowers of Romania
Olympic medalists in rowing
Medalists at the 1992 Summer Olympics
Medalists at the 1988 Summer Olympics
Medalists at the 1984 Summer Olympics
Olympic silver medalists for Romania
World Rowing Championships medalists for Romania